Younes Delfi (born 2 October 2000) is an Iranian professional footballer who plays as a forward for Foolad. He is the youngest Iranian player to have played in Europe.

International career
Delfi is a very technical player displaying his talent initially at the 2017 FIFA U-17 World Cup in India. He burst onto the scene by recording 2 goals and 1 assist in the group stages of the competition. He also showed phenomenal technical ability by also getting 2 penalties for the Iran U-17 national team in the 3 group matches.

Career statistics

Honours

National
Iran U17
AFC U-16 Championship - Runner-up (1): 2016

References

External links 
Younes Delfi on Instagram 
Younes Delfi on Twitter 
 
Younes Delfi on teammelli.com  

2000 births
Living people
Sportspeople from Khuzestan province
Iranian footballers
Esteghlal Khuzestan players
R. Charleroi S.C. players
HNK Gorica players
Foolad FC players
Persian Gulf Pro League players
Belgian Pro League players
Croatian Football League players
Iranian expatriate footballers
Expatriate footballers in Belgium
Iranian expatriate sportspeople in Belgium
Expatriate footballers in Croatia
Iranian expatriate sportspeople in Croatia
Association football forwards
Association football wingers
Footballers at the 2018 Asian Games
Asian Games competitors for Iran